Hurricane Able was the first named tropical cyclone in the Atlantic hurricane database, and was also the first of six major hurricanes in the 1950 Atlantic hurricane season. Its development was confirmed on August 12 by the Hurricane Hunters, which is a group that intentionally flies into a hurricane for observations. Hurricane Able initially threatened to strike the Bahamas, but instead turned to the northwest and later to the northeast. After brushing those islands and Cape Cod, Able moved ashore on Nova Scotia as a minimal hurricane. It later crossed Newfoundland and dissipated on August 24.

The hurricane prompted standard precautions in the Bahamas and Florida, although it did not affect the region. In North Carolina, winds and waves brushed the coast, while around New York City, heavy rainfall caused some flooding. Along Cape Cod and Nantucket, Able produced winds up to 55 mph (90 km/h) and high waves, and across New England there were nine traffic fatalities. The hurricane killed 2 people in Canada and caused over $1 million in damage.

Meteorological history

The beginning of the 1950 Atlantic hurricane season was considered "remarkably quiet" by the U.S. Weather Bureau, with no noteworthy activity until early August. A Hurricane Hunters flight into an easterly wave on August 12 indicated a developing tropical storm east of the Lesser Antilles; it was later given the name "Able", which is the first name in the Joint Army/Navy Phonetic Alphabet. It moved steadily northwestward and reached hurricane status on August 14, as it passed to the north of the Leeward Islands. The next day, Hurricane Able turned to the west and west-southwest, due to a high pressure system to its north. On August 17 it attained major hurricane status, and by early on August 18 reconnaissance aircraft measured winds of 140 mph (225 km/h), though Atlantic hurricane reanalysis later determined that those winds were unrepresentative of the intensity. At the time, the storm was 350 miles (565 km) in diameter.

Able was expected to continue to the west toward the Bahamas and Florida. It was the strongest hurricane to threaten the Bahamanian capital, Nassau, since a hurricane in 1929. The hurricane turned to the northwest, however, sparing the Bahamas from the strongest winds. The next day Able accelerated to the northeast, after passing just offshore Cape Hatteras, North Carolina. Having maintained peak winds for 12 hours, Hurricane Able began to weaken on August 20, and early the next day it moved quickly by Cape Cod. Subsequently, it deteriorated into an extratropical cyclone, and Able crossed Newfoundland before dissipating early on August 24 in the far northern Atlantic Ocean.

Impact and records

When Hurricane Able was expected to move through the Bahamas, people executed standard preparations such as securing windows and bringing ships to harbor. One cruise liner diverted its route from the Bahamas toward New York. In Florida, the U.S. Air Force made preliminary plans to move planes. Ultimately, the hurricane spared the region. Further north, the United States Weather Bureau issued northeast storm warnings from Morehead City, North Carolina to the Eastern Shore of Virginia. There, the hurricane ended up bringing light winds and rough waves. Moderate precipitation occurred along the North Carolina coast. In southern New England, Able dropped 3 – 5 inches (75 – 125 mm) of rainfall, with a peak of 6.89 inches (175 mm) in Beechwood, Massachusetts. Flooding was reported in portions of New York City. The resulting slick roads from the rains caused nine traffic fatalities across New England. The storm produced 55 mph (90 km/h) gusts in Nantucket and Cape Cod, along with high tides and waves. Offshore, the waves damaged a freighter headed for Florida.

In Nova Scotia, Able produced hurricane-force winds, the only land along its path to receive such winds; a gust of 99 mph (160 km/h) was reported in Halifax. The hurricane also dropped heavy rainfall, including over 4.92 inches (125 mm) in Annapolis Valley. Initially there were three fishing boats missing throughout the region, although two later returned to harbor. By August 22, the third was still missing over the Grand Banks, which prompted a rescue team to search for the boat. Many other boats crashed against the coast, and two children died when their raft capsized. Two bridges and several roadways were washed out or flooded, and in Charlottetown, Prince Edward Island, floodwaters left roadways impassable. On land, Able produced heavy damage estimated at over $1 million (CAD), half of which in Annapolis Valley, and split between crops, communications, and fishing industries.

From 1950 through 1952, names from the Joint Army/Navy Phonetic Alphabet were first used for storms in the North Atlantic. Able is the first name in the alphabet, and as such, Hurricane Able in 1950 was the first name officially to be used for an Atlantic hurricane. It was also the first of eight major hurricanes in the 1950 Atlantic hurricane season, which as of 2010 was thought to be the record for the most major hurricanes in a season. However, as of 2014, it was found that several storms in 1950 were weaker than thought, and it was found that only six major hurricanes formed, so the record is now held by 2005.

See also

1950 Atlantic hurricane season

References

External links
National Hurricane Center

1950 Atlantic hurricane season
Category 3 Atlantic hurricanes
Hurricanes in North Carolina
Hurricanes in Canada
1950 natural disasters in the United States
1950 in Canada